Konstantin Dobrev (born 16 June 1974) is a Bulgarian badminton player from BC Academics Sofia club.

Konstantin Dobrev is one of the most important Bulgarian badminton players of the 1990s and 2000s. He took part in several world championships and won 11 titles at the National level. He was also successful at Balkans, Finland, Greece, Cyprus and in Romania at the International level.

Achievements

IBF/BWF International 
Men's singles

Men's doubles

Mixed doubles

  BWF International Challenge tournament
  BWF International Series tournament
  BWF Future Series tournament

References 

1974 births
Living people
Bulgarian male badminton players
20th-century Bulgarian people